Veliky Ustyug is a town in Vologda Oblast, Russia.

Veliky Ustyug may also refer to:
Veliky Ustyug (pseudometeorite)
Veliky Ustyug Airport